Chahar Borj (also Romanized as Chahār Borj; also known as Chahār Borj-e Qadīm (Persian: چهار برج قدیم) and Chahār Borj-e Bālā; formerly, Charbish and Charbysh) is a city in the Central District of Chaharborj County, West Azerbaijan province, Iran, and serves as capital of the county.

At the 2006 census, its population was 7,940 in 1,937 households, when it was in Marhemetabad District of Miandoab County. The following census in 2011 counted 8,681 people in 2,496 households. The latest census in 2016 showed a population of 9,406 people in 2,793 households. Marhemetabad District was separated from Miandoab County, elevated to the status of Chaharborj County, and divided into two districts in 2020, with Chahar Borj as capital of the newly established county.

References 

Cities in West Azerbaijan Province

Populated places in West Azerbaijan Province